Let It Rain is a lost 1927 American silent comedy film produced by and starring Douglas MacLean, directed by Edward F. Cline, and featuring Boris Karloff in a minor role as a U.S. mail robber.  Paramount Pictures distributed the film. The film is now lost.

Plot
A Marine sergeant named "Let-It-Rain" Riley falls in love with a young lady and goes AWOL in order to meet up with her before a sailor aboard his ship (who he competes with for girls) can take his shore leave to go meet her. During the events that follow, Riley and the girl expose the criminals behind a mail robbery. Riley winds up getting his commission as well as the girl.

Cast
 Douglas MacLean as 'Let-It-Rain' Riley
 Shirley Mason as The Girl
 Wade Boteler as Kelly (a gob)
 Frank Campeau as Marine Major
 James Bradbury Jr. as Butch
 Lincoln Stedman as Bugs
 Lee Shumway as Marine Captain
 Jim Mason as Crook (as James Mason)
 Eddie Sturgis as Crook (as Edwin Sturgis)
 Ernest Hilliard as Crook
 Boris Karloff as Crook

See also
 Boris Karloff filmography

References

External links

1927 films
1927 comedy films
American silent feature films
American black-and-white films
Films directed by Edward F. Cline
Paramount Pictures films
Lost American films
Military humor in film
Films about the United States Marine Corps
Silent American comedy films
1927 lost films
Lost comedy films
1920s American films